The 2022 Henry Ford Health System 200 was the 12th stock car race of the 2022 ARCA Menards Series season, and the 34th iteration of the event. The race was held on Saturday, August 6, 2022, in Brooklyn, Michigan at Michigan International Speedway, a 2.0 mile (3.2 km) permanent oval-shaped racetrack. The race was contested over 100 laps. In an exciting battle for the win, Nick Sanchez, driving for Rev Racing, held off Daniel Dye and Corey Heim in the final few laps for his fourth career ARCA Menards Series win, and his third of the season. Heim would mostly dominate the race, leading 54 laps.

Background 
The track is used primarily for NASCAR events. It is sometimes known as a sister track to Texas World Speedway, and was used as the basis of Auto Club Speedway. The track is owned by NASCAR. Michigan International Speedway is recognized as one of motorsports' premier facilities because of its wide racing surface and high banking (by open-wheel standards; the 18-degree banking is modest by stock car standards).

Entry list 

 (R) denotes rookie driver

Practice 
The only 35-minute practice session was held on Saturday, August 6, at 10:45 AM EST.

Qualifying 
Qualifying was held on Saturday, August 6, at 11:30 AM EST. The qualifying system used is a single-car, one-lap system with only one round. Whoever sets the fastest time in the round wins the pole.

Race results

Standings after the race 

Drivers' Championship standings

Note: Only the first 10 positions are included for the driver standings.

References

External links 

2022 ARCA Menards Series
NASCAR races at Michigan International Speedway
Henry Ford Health System 200
2022 in sports in Michigan